In 2019, twenty seven U.S. states proposed cannabis reform legislation for medical marijuana and non-medical adult use. State-level legalization remains at odds with cannabis' status as a Schedule I narcotic under the Controlled Substances Act at the Federal level.

Major publications predicted several state legislatures would propose legislation in 2019, or voters would do so directly via initiative. These included Connecticut, Hawaii, Minnesota, New Hampshire, New Jersey, New Mexico, New York, Rhode Island and Illinois. Ohio Marijuana Legalization Initiative (filed in 2018) may appear on the 2019 ballot.

Legislation and initiatives passed in 2019
Delaware  Senate Substitute 1 for Senate Bill 37 (SB 37), expungement of one cannabis related felony or misdemeanor, became law June 30
Georgia HB 324,  allowing medical cannabis to be grown and sold (ratified by governor April 17)
Hawaii HB 1383, decriminalization (passed state House of Representatives March 7, amended bill passed Senate April 9, reconciled April 26)
Illinois Cannabis Regulation and Tax Act (Illinois House Bill 1438), legalization and regulation; passed by state legislature on May 31. Effective January 1, 2020.
New Mexico Senate Bill 323, decriminalization
North Dakota HB 1050, partial decriminalization (criminal infraction without jail)
Texas HB 3703, expansion of medical cannabis program qualifying conditions
Texas HB 1325, legalized hemp

Legislation and initiatives introduced in 2019

State

Federal
Marijuana Freedom and Opportunity Act, would deschedule cannabis, cosponsored by Chuck Schumer
SAFE Banking Act, moved out of committee and placed on Union Calendar June 6
STATES Act
FY2020 spending bill rider, recognizing state-legal cannabis passed in House on June 20, 267 to 165
Marijuana Opportunity Reinvestment and Expungement (MORE) Act introduced in Congress by House Judiciary Committee chairman Jerry Nadler and Presidential candidate Senator Kamala Harris, would provide for de-scheduling, federal legalization and expungement
Marijuana Justice Act
Ending Federal Marijuana Prohibition Act

References

External links
Marijuana on the ballot at Ballotpedia

Cannabis reform proposals 2019
Cannabis reform 2019

2019 United States
Reform proposals 2019